Dino Costantini (born 18 October 1940) is an Italian equestrian. He competed at the 1972 Summer Olympics and the 1988 Summer Olympics.

References

External links
 

1940 births
Living people
Italian male equestrians
Olympic equestrians of Italy
Equestrians at the 1972 Summer Olympics
Equestrians at the 1988 Summer Olympics
Sportspeople from the Province of Macerata